Rihard Jakopič (12 April 1869 – 21 April 1943) was a Slovene painter. He was the leading Slovene Impressionist painter, patron of arts and theoretician. Together with Matej Sternen, Matija Jama and Ivan Grohar, he is considered the pioneer of Slovene Impressionist painting.

Life 

Rihard Jakopič was born in Krakovo, a suburb of Ljubljana, the capital of Carniola in the Austria-Hungary, now Slovenia. His father, Franc Jakopič, was a well-situated tradesman with agricultural goods. His mother was Neža, née Dolžan. Rihard was the youngest of eight children.

Jakopič studied at the intermediate secondary school from 1879 to 1887. After passing an entry exam, he attended the Academy of Fine Arts in Vienna, for a short time returned home due to an illness, and then resumed his studies in 1888. In 1889, he entered the Academy of Fine Arts in Munich and in 1890, the Ažbe Art School in Munich. Then he lived in Ljubljana, where he participated in the establishment of the Slovene Art Society, and after 1902 in Škofja Loka. In 1903, he continued his studies at the Academy of Fine Arts in Prague. Jakopič returned to Ljubljana in 1906. He was one of the early members of the Slovenian Academy of Sciences and Arts, founded in 1938.

Jakopič died at his home in Ljubljana at 1:45 pm on 21 April 1943 after a long and difficult illness. A wake was held at his residence at New Square no. 2, and he was buried at Holy Cross Cemetery (now Žale Cemetery) on 23 April 1943 after a ceremony at 3:30 pm at Saint Joseph's Chapel.

Legacy

Over 1200 paintings and 650 drawings by Jakopič have been preserved.

In Ljubljana, Jakopič established the Slovene School of Impressionist Drawing and Painting, the predecessor of the Academy of Fine Arts at the University of Ljubljana. He was an initiator for the foundation of the National Gallery of Slovenia. In 1908, he built a pavilion in Tivoli Park, based on plans by the architect Max Fabiani. The Jakopič Pavilion became the central venue for art exhibitions in the Slovene Lands at the time. In 1962, due to the relocation of a railway line, it was demolished.

Commemoration
In 1965 a primary school in Šiška was named after him. Since 1969, the Jakopič Award, the highest Slovenian award in fine arts, is presented annually. In 1970–72, a statue of Jakopič by Bojan Kunaver was erected on the original site of the pavilion. In 1979, a new Jakopič Gallery opened at Slovene Street in Ljubljana. After Slovenia declared independence from Yugoslavia, Jakopič was portrayed by Rudi Španzel on the 100 Slovenian tolar banknote, in circulation from October 1991 until the introduction of euro in January 2007.

Selected works

Sončni breg (Sunny Hillside) (1903), National Gallery, Ljubljana
Breze v jeseni (Birches in Autumn) (1903), National Gallery, Ljubljana
Kamnitnik v snegu (Kamnitnik in the Snow) (1903), National Gallery, Ljubljana
Sončni breg (Sunny Hillside) (1903), National Gallery, Ljubljana
Zima (Winter) (1904), National Gallery, Ljubljana
Pri svetilki (By the lamp) (1904), National Gallery, Ljubljana
Študija sonca (A Study of the Sun) (1905), National Gallery, Ljubljana
Križanke (1909), National Gallery, Ljubljana
Spomini (Memories) (1912), National Gallery, Ljubljana
Zeleni pajčolan (The Green Veil) (1915), National Gallery, Ljubljana
Večer na Savi (Evening on the Sava River) (1926), National Gallery, Ljubljana
Slepec (Blind man) (1926), National Gallery, Ljubljana

References

External links

Slovene Early Modernism: Rihard Jakopič. National Gallery of Slovenia site. Retrieved 8 May 2012.

 
1869 births
1943 deaths
People from the City Municipality of Ljubljana
Academic staff of the University of Ljubljana
Slovenian impressionist painters
Members of the Slovenian Academy of Sciences and Arts
Academy of Fine Arts, Prague alumni
Academy of Fine Arts Vienna alumni
Academy of Fine Arts, Munich alumni
People with epilepsy
Burials at Žale